Benešov u Prahy is a railway station in Benešov in the Czech Republic. it is located on the Benešov–České Budějovice railway, Prague–Benešov railway and Benešov–Trhový Štěpánov railway. The train services are operated by České dráhy.

History
The railway station was opened in 1871.

Protection
The building of the railway station is protected as a cultural monument.

Train services
The following services currently call at the station:

Prague – Benešov – Tábor – Soběslav – Veselí nad Lužnicí – České Budějovice
S9 Prague – Říčany – Strančice – Mirošovice – Čerčany – Benešov
Sp ARRIVA Prague – Říčany – Mnichovice – Senohraby – Čerčany – Benešov
Osobní (local stopping service) Benešov – Postupice – Vlašim – Trhový Štěpánov

References

External links

Station profile at cd.cz 

Railway stations in Central Bohemian Region
Railway stations opened in 1871
Buildings and structures in Benešov